The Saro A.33 was a British prototype flying boat built by Saunders-Roe Limited in response to a British Air Ministry Specification R.2/33 and in competition with the Short Sunderland.

Design and development
The A.33 was a four-engined flying-boat with a parasol monospar wing, the wing was supported by two angled N-struts which connected the wing to hull-mounted sponsons. The hull-mounted sponsons were used rather than wingtip floats and were also used as fuel tanks. A Saro Cloud was modified with a monospar wing and sponsons to test the design concepts.  The A.33 serial number K4773 first flew on 14 October 1938. However, the A33 prototype was written off after structural failure sustained during high-speed taxi trials on 25 October 1938 and development was abandoned.  A production contract for eleven aircraft was cancelled.

Specifications

See also
Short Sunderland

References
Notes 

Bibliography
London, Peter. British Flying Boats. Stroud, UK:Sutton Publishing, 2003. .

External links 

 History of War article

1930s British patrol aircraft
Flying boats
A.33
Four-engined tractor aircraft
Parasol-wing aircraft
Four-engined piston aircraft